Steve 'Slippery' Morris (born 19 June 1957) is an Australian former rugby league footballer who played in the 1970s and 1980s. A state and national representative, his club career was played with the St. George Dragons and the Eastern Suburbs Roosters.

Career

Initially a halfback, Morris came to selectors' attention when playing for the Dapto club. In the 1978 season he gained selection in the New South Wales Country Rugby League side and was then chosen to represent New South Wales and Australia.

St. George Dragons

In season 1979 Morris joined the St George club and won a premiership in his début year in the Sydney top grade. In the 1979 Grand Final he took out the Best Player award, the Dave Brown Medal (now known as the Clive Churchill Medal).

In 1984, under Dragons coach Roy Masters, the speedy halfback made a very successful transition to the Wing position, that season he was awarded the 'Dally M' medal for winger of the year. He was the NSW Rugby Football League's top try scorer in 1984. He also played wing for St. George Dragons in the 1985 Grand Final.

In all, Morris played 180 games for the Dragons over eight years at the club and whilst he did not represent for Australia again he made further appearances for the New South Wales Blues under the State of Origin selection criteria on the wing in game III of 1984, and game I of 1986.

Sydney Roosters

In 1987 he moved to the Eastern Suburbs club playing 58 matches over two seasons and winning a third "Dally M Winger of the Year" award. During the Australian off-season Morris enjoyed a successful stint at English club, Leeds.  Morris played , i.e. number 2, in Leeds' 14-15 defeat by St. Helens in the 1987–88 John Player Special Trophy Final during the 1987–88 season at Central Park, Wigan on Saturday 9 January 1988.

Steve Morris retired from the game in 1990. His twin sons Brett and Josh Morris are current National Rugby League (NRL) players. 

He currently teaches physical education at Bomaderry High School on the South Coast.

References

Sources
 Whiticker, Alan & Hudson, Glen (2006) The Encyclopedia of Rugby League Players, Gavin Allen Publishing, Sydney
 Andrews, Malcolm (2006) The ABC of Rugby League Austn Broadcasting Corpn, Sydney

1957 births
Living people
Australia national rugby league team players
Australian rugby league players
Clive Churchill Medal winners
Dapto Canaries players
Leeds Rhinos players
New South Wales Rugby League State of Origin players
Rugby league players from Wollongong
Rugby league wingers
Salford Red Devils players
St. George Dragons players
Sydney Roosters players
Warrington Wolves players